Emphytoecia camousseighti is a species of beetle in the family Cerambycidae. It was described by Cerda in 1995. It is known from Chile.

References

Pteropliini
Beetles described in 1995
Endemic fauna of Chile